Mutyalapalem is a village in East Godavari district in the state of Andhra Pradesh, India.

Geography
Mutyalapalem covers around 412 acres, and has approximately 210 houses. The total population of the village is around 1000. It is part of the Konaseema delta, a triangle formed by the waters of the Godavari River and the delta.

Gallery

References

Villages in East Godavari district